The Triton Financial Classic was a golf tournament on the Champions Tour from 2003 to 2009. It was played annually in Austin, Texas at The Hills Country Club.

The purse for the 2009 tournament was US$1,600,000, with $240,000 going to the winner. The tournament was founded in 2003 as the Kinko's Classic of Austin.

Winners
Triton Financial Classic
2009 Bernhard Langer

FedEx Kinko's Classic
2008 Denis Watson
2007 Scott Hoch
2006 Jay Haas
2005 Jim Thorpe
2004 Larry Nelson

Kinko's Classic of Austin
2003 Hale Irwin

Source:

Tournament highlights
2003: Hale Irwin wins the inaugural edition of the tournament by defeating Tom Watson on the second hole of a sudden death playoff. This in spite of a final round meltdown by Irwin that included his throwing a ball in the creek after making double bogey and, on another hole, he whiffed on a very short putt, and then topped the next.
2008: Denis Watson birdies the 54th hole to win by one shot over Nick Price. Price looked to be in command of the tournament until he made double bogey on both the 51st and 52nd holes.
2009: Bernhard Langer wins the last edition of the tournament by six shots over Dana Quigley and Mark O'Meara.

References

External links
PGATOUR.com tournament website
Tournament results (2003-2009) at GolfObserver.com

Former PGA Tour Champions events
Golf in Texas
Sports in Austin, Texas
Recurring sporting events established in 2003
Recurring sporting events disestablished in 2009
2003 establishments in Texas
2009 disestablishments in Texas
Defunct sports competitions in the United States